Geoff Raines (born 10 August 1956) is a former Australian rules football player who played in the VFL between 1976 and 1982 for the Richmond Football Club, between 1983 and 1985 for the Collingwood Football Club, in 1986 for the Essendon Football Club and between 1987 and 1989 for the Brisbane Bears Football Club.

His numerous football achievements include a VFL premiership medallion (1980), three Jack Dyer medals (Richmond best and fairest), two-time All-Australian selection, and an induction to the Richmond Hall of Fame and Team of the Century. Controversially, Raines received no Brownlow votes in Richmond's 1980 premiership year despite being judged by Richmond to be the club's best player. Raines maintains that he was the victim of a conspiracy to deprive him of votes, a charge which was denied by the former chief of the AFL Umpires Association.

Raines's son Andrew Raines played in the Australian Football League for Richmond, Brisbane and Gold Coast.

References

Sources 
 Hogan P: The Tigers Of Old, Richmond FC, Melbourne 1996

External links
 
 

Living people
Richmond Football Club players
Richmond Football Club Premiership players
Collingwood Football Club players
Essendon Football Club players
Brisbane Bears players
Victorian State of Origin players
Jack Dyer Medal winners
All-Australians (1953–1988)
1956 births
Australian rules footballers from Victoria (Australia)
One-time VFL/AFL Premiership players